Industrial Nature is the regeneration of natural vegetation on industrial sites; the invasion of abandoned or disused industrial sites by colonising species; or new plantings on abandoned, disused or remediated industrial sites. The underlying principal is that the historical industrial use of landscapes or sites creates a new environment which species can use either by design as in the case of a park or revegetated area, or by colonisation.

The concept has its origins in Germany, specifically at the Emscher Landscape Park in the Ruhr, (of which the Landschaftspark Duisburg-Nord is the best known example) and has been applied at the Sudgelande Park in Berlin.

Another example can be found at the Deutsches Technikmuseum German Museum of Technology (Berlin), at the former locomotive workshops and goods yard (Anhalter Güterbahnhof) of Berlin-Anhalt Railway Company. Here much of the goods yards and part of the roundhouse complex has been left as a ruin, colonised by a variety of non-native plants.

See also 

 Brownfields
 Cultural landscape

References 

 Bothmann, Frank, and Sabine  Auer. 2009. The New Emscher Valley – Reshaping an urban Landscape creates regional Identity. In REAL CORP 2009: Cities 3.0 – smart, sustainable, integrative. Strategies, concepts and technologies for planning the urban future, edited by M. SCHRENK, V. V. POPOVICH, D. ENGELKE and P. ELISEI.
 Drexler, Justina 2005. Post-Industrial Nature in the Coal Mine of Göttelborn, Germany: The Integration of Ruderal Vegetation in the Conversion of a Brownfield, in Wild Urban Woodlands New Perspectives for Urban Forestry, edited by I. Kowarik and S. Körner. Berlin: Springer

External links 
 International Brownfields Case Study: Emscher Park, Germany
 

Nature
Cultural heritage
Cultural landscapes